The Großer Löffler is a mountain in the Zillertal Alps on the border between Tyrol, Austria, and South Tyrol, Italy.

References 

 Heinrich Klier, Walter Klier: Alpenvereinsführer Zillertaler Alpen, Rother Verlag München (1996), 
 Alpenvereinskarte 1:25.000, Blatt 35/2, Zillertaler Alpen, Mitte

External links 

Mountains of the Alps
Mountains of Tyrol (state)
Mountains of South Tyrol
Alpine three-thousanders
Zillertal Alps
Austria–Italy border
International mountains of Europe